Psittaculini is a tribe of parrots of the family Psittaculidae.   The subdivisions within the tribe are controversial.

Tribe Psittaculini
 Genus Psittinus
 Blue-rumped parrot, Psittinus cyanurus
 Simeulue parrot, Psittinus abbotti
 Genus Geoffroyus
 Red-cheeked parrot, Geoffroyus geoffroyi
 Blue-collared parrot, Geoffroyus simplex
 Song parrot, Geoffroyus heteroclitus
 Rennell parrot, Geoffroyus hyacinthinus
 Genus Prioniturus
 Montane racket-tail, Prioniturus montanus
 Mindanao racket-tail, Prioniturus waterstradti
 Blue-headed racket-tail, Prioniturus platenae
 Green racket-tail, Prioniturus luconensis
 Blue-crowned racket-tail, Prioniturus discurus
 Blue-winged racket-tail, Prioniturus verticalis (also known as Sulu Racquet-tail)
 Yellow-breasted racket-tail, Prioniturus flavicans
 Golden-mantled racket-tail, Prioniturus platurus
 Buru racket-tail, Prioniturus mada
 Mindoro racket-tail, Prioniturus mindorensis
 Genus Tanygnathus
 Great-billed parrot, Tanygnathus megalorynchos
 Blue-naped parrot, Tanygnathus lucionensis
 Blue-backed parrot, Tanygnathus sumatranus
 Black-lored parrot, Tanygnathus gramineus
 Genus Eclectus
 Moluccan eclectus, Eclectus roratus
 Sumba eclectus, Eclectus cornelia
 Tanimbar eclectus, Eclectus riedeli
 Papuan eclectus, Eclectus polychros
 †Oceanic eclectus, Eclectus infectus (extinct)
 Genus Psittacula
 Alexandrine parakeet, Psittacula eupatria
 †Seychelles parakeet, Psittacula wardi (extinct)
 Rose-ringed parakeet, Psittacula krameri
 Echo parakeet, Psittacula eques
 †Réunion parakeet, Psittacula eques eques (extinct)
 †Newton's parakeet, Psittacula exsul (extinct)
 Slaty-headed parakeet, Psittacula himalayana
 Grey-headed parakeet, Psittacula finschii
 Plum-headed parakeet, Psittacula cyanocephala
 Blossom-headed parakeet, Psittacula roseata
 Blue-winged parakeet, Psittacula columboides
 Layard's parakeet, Psittacula calthropae
 Lord Derby's parakeet, Psittacula derbiana
 Red-breasted parakeet, Psittacula alexandri
 Nicobar parakeet, Psittacula caniceps
 Long-tailed parakeet, Psittacula longicauda
 Genus Lophopsittacus (extinct)
 Mauritius grey parrot, Lophopsittacus (disputed) bensoni
 Broad-billed parrot, Lophopsittacus mauritianus (extinct)
 Genus Necropsittacus (extinct)
 Rodrigues parrot Necropsittacus rodericanus (extinct)

References
Australian Biological Resources Study

 
Bird tribes
Psittaculinae